Samuel William Austin (29 April 1900 – 2 April 1979) was an English professional footballer who played professionally for Norwich City, Manchester City and Chesterfield.

Austin joined Manchester City from Norwich City (for whom he had scored 39 goals in 164 matches) in May 1924 for £2,000. He played for Manchester City 160 times scoring 43 goals. In his entire career he made 358 appearances scoring 86 goals. He also won one England cap.

References

Additional sources
Canary Citizens by Mark Davage, John Eastwood, Kevin Platt, published by Jarrold Publishing, (2001),

External links
Profile on englandfootballonline

1900 births
1979 deaths
English footballers
England international footballers
Manchester City F.C. players
Norwich City F.C. players
English Football League players
Association football outside forwards
FA Cup Final players